Kindler syndrome (also known as "bullous acrokeratotic poikiloderma of Kindler and Weary",)  is a rare congenital disease of the skin caused by a mutation in the KIND1 gene.

Symptoms and signs
Infants and young children with Kindler syndrome have a tendency to blister with minor trauma and are prone to sunburns. As individuals with Kindler syndrome age, they tend to have fewer problems with blistering and photosensitivity. However, pigment changes and thinning of the skin become more prominent. Kindler syndrome can affect various mucous tissues such as the mouth and eyes, which can lead to other health problems.

Genetics

Kindler syndrome is an autosomal recessive genodermatosis. The KIND1 gene mutated in Kindler syndrome codes for the protein kindlin-1, which is thought to be active in the interactions between actin and the extracellular matrix (focal adhesion plaques). Kindler syndrome was first described in 1954 by Theresa Kindler.

Diagnosis
Clinical and genetic tests are used to confirm diagnosis.

Management
Treatment may involve several different types of practitioner to address the various manifestations that may occur. This multidisciplinary team  will also be involved in preventing secondary complications.

See also 
 Rothmund–Thomson syndrome
 Epidermolysis bullosa
 List of cutaneous conditions

References

External links 

Genodermatoses
Rare syndromes
Autosomal recessive disorders
Papulosquamous hyperkeratotic cutaneous conditions
Syndromes affecting the skin